Eastern Orthodoxy in Hungary refers to communities, institutions and organizations of the Eastern Orthodox Christianity in Hungary. Historically, Eastern Orthodoxy was an important denomination in the medieval and early modern Kingdom of Hungary. In modern times, Eastern Orthodoxy is mainly the religion of some ethnic minorities. In the 2001 national census, only 15,928 persons declared themselves Orthodox Christians (0.21% of the people with declared religious affiliation and 0.15% of the whole population).

History

Between the middle of the 10th and the beginning of the 13th century, medieval Hungary had occasional political ties with the Byzantine Empire and Kievan Rus'. In the middle of the 10th century, the Patriarchate of Constantinople sent a mission, headed by bishop Hierotheos, to the Principality of Hungary. During medieval period, there was significant presence of Eastern Orthodoxy in some southern and eastern parts of medieval Kingdom of Hungary, mainly by Romanian and Ukrainian minorities.

In 1440, Hungarian king Ladislaus the Posthumous granted special privileges to Eastern Orthodox Christians for the establishment of the Serbian Kovin Monastery. In 1481 and 1495, during the times of Turkish invasions, Hungarian kings Matthias Corvinus and Vladislaus II have granted special privileges to Eastern Orthodox Christians in order to secure demographic recovery and improve the defenses of southern frontiers.

Historically, from the late Middle Ages up to the beginning of the 20th century, the territory of Hungary has been the exclusive jurisdiction of Serbian Orthodox Church through the Eparchy of Buda, created in the 16th century. Its seat located in the town of Szentendre, near Budapest.

Now there are other jurisdictions of the Eastern Orthodox Church also active in Hungary.

The Russian Orthodox Church has the Budapest and Hungarian Eparchy headed by Archbishop Mark, whose see is in Budapest. The Budapest and Hungarian Eparchy of the Russian Orthodox Church has eleven parishes, with eight priests and one deacon.

The Ecumenical Patriarchate of Constantinople also maintains a presence in Hungary. The Hungarian Exarchate is part of the Metropolis of Vienna of the Ecumenical Patriarchate of Constantinople. They have seven parishes in the country.

The Romanian Orthodox Church has the Diocese of Gyula headed by Siluan Mănuilă, whose see is in Gyula.

The Bulgarian Orthodox Church has two parishes in Hungary, in Budapest and Pécs, with one priest. Both parishes are under the authority of the Bulgarian Orthodox Eparchy for Central and Western Europe.

See also
 History of Christianity in Hungary
 Metropolitanate of Tourkia
 Union of Uzhhorod
 Metropolitanate of Karlovci

References

Literature 

 
 
 
 
 
 
 
 
 
 
 Éva Révész, Régészeti és történeti adatok a kora árpád-kori bizánci-bolgár-magyar egyházi kapcsolatokhoz, Doktori értekezés, Szeged 2011.

External links
 Budapest and Hungarian Eparchy of the Russian Orthodox Church
 Romanian Orthodox Eparchy of Hungary
 Hungarian Exarchate